St. Hedwig Cemetery may refer to:

St. Hedwig Cemetery (Massachusetts), in Southbridge, Massachusetts, United States
St. Hedwig Cemetery (Michigan), in Dearborn Heights, Michigan, United States
St. Hedwig Cemetery (New Jersey), in Mercer County, New Jersey, United States
St. Hedwig Cemetery (Wisconsin), in Thorp, Wisconsin, United States
St. Hedwig Cemetery (Berlin), with St. Hedwig's Cathedral in Berlin, Germany
St. Hedwig Cemetery (Pennsylvania) in Larksville, Pennsylvania, United States